Infrared compact or IRc designations are objects in several astronomical catalogues. The first is a list of near-infrared sources in the NGC 6334 molecular cloud. There are also a series of infrared catalogues of objects in Orion.

References

Astronomical catalogues